Nogometno društvo Bilje, commonly referred to as ND Bilje or simply Bilje, is a Slovenian football club from Bilje. As of the 2022–23 season, they compete in the Slovenian Second League, the second-highest football league in Slovenia. The club was founded in 1946.

Honours

Slovenian Third League
Winners (1): 2017–18

Slovenian Fourth Division
Winners (3): 1999–2000, 2011–12, 2013–14

MNZ Nova Gorica Cup
Winners (2): 1993–94, 2017–18

References

External links
Official website 

Association football clubs established in 1946
Football clubs in Slovenia
1946 establishments in Slovenia